The Watney Mann Invitation Cup (normally referred to as simply the Watney Cup) was a short-lived English football tournament held in the early 1970s.

It was held before the start of the season, and was contested by the teams that had scored the most goals in each of the four divisions of the Football League the previous season who had not been promoted or admitted to one of the European competitions. Two teams from each division took part, making eight participants in total.

The competition was a straight knockout format, each match was a one-off with no replays. The final took place at the home ground of one of the finalists, rather than a neutral venue.

The competition was so named thanks to a sponsorship deal with the Watney Mann brewery; the first tournament for English Football League clubs to sell its naming rights. The tournament ran four times, from 1970 to 1973, before being discontinued.

From the second season of the competition, the off-side law was applied from the edge of the penalty areas only (instead of the half-way line). This measure was designed to reduce midfield congestion and promote more goals, at a time when defences were becoming much better organised.

The first ever penalty shootout in England took place in a semi-final of the 1970 tournament between Hull City and Manchester United, and was won by Manchester United. The first footballer to take a kick was George Best, and the first to miss was Denis Law, whose attempt was saved by Hull goalkeeper Ian McKechnie. McKechnie became the first player to miss a deciding kick, when he shot wide after taking the fifth kick for Hull in the shoot-out.

Following the dissolution of the competition in 1975 the trophy itself was put up for sale and purchased by Derby Museum, who presented it back to Derby County. It was put on display in the club trophy cabinet where, in 2018, it was spotted by the chairperson of Stoke City fan's council who helped arrange a share deal between Derby and Stoke City, who had been the last winners prior to the competition finishing.

List of finals

Participants

1970
First Division
Derby County
Manchester United
Second Division
Hull City
Sheffield United
Third Division
Fulham
Reading
Fourth Division
Aldershot
Peterborough United

1971
First Division
Manchester United
West Bromwich Albion
Second Division
Carlisle United
Luton Town
Third Division
Halifax Town
Wrexham
Fourth Division
Colchester United
Crewe Alexandra

1972
First Division
Sheffield United
Wolverhampton Wanderers
Second Division
Blackpool
Burnley
Third Division
Bristol Rovers
Notts County
Fourth Division
Lincoln City
Peterborough United

1973
First Division
Stoke City
West Ham United
Second Division
Bristol City
Hull City
Third Division
Bristol Rovers
Plymouth Argyle
Fourth Division
Mansfield Town
Peterborough United

References

Defunct football cup competitions in England
Recurring sporting events established in 1970
1970 establishments in England